The Oudon is a  long river in the Mayenne and Maine-et-Loire départements, western France. Its source is near La Gravelle. It flows generally south east. It is a right tributary of the Mayenne into which it flows between Le Lion-d'Angers and Grez-Neuville.

Its main tributary is the Verzée.

Départements and communes along its course
The river flows through the following départements and localities, from source to mouth: 
 Mayenne: La Gravelle, Saint-Cyr-le-Gravelais, Ruillé-le-Gravelais, Montjean, Beaulieu-sur-Oudon, Méral, Cossé-le-Vivien, La Chapelle-Craonnaise, Athée, Livré-la-Touche, Craon, Bouchamps-lès-Craon, Chérancé
 Maine-et-Loire: Châtelais, L'Hôtellerie-de-Flée, Nyoiseau, Sainte-Gemmes-d'Andigné, Segré, La Chapelle-sur-Oudon, Andigné, Louvaines, Saint-Martin-du-Bois, Montreuil-sur-Maine, Le Lion-d'Angers and Grez-Neuville

Navigation 
The Oudon was canalised in the 19th century from Segré to the river Mayenne, over a distance of 18 km with three locks. The waterway was used to transport timber for construction, granite and slate. The river, restored to navigation in 1980, is now part of the popular Anjou river network, with the Mayenne, Sarthe and their "common trunk" of the Maine down to the river Loire.

References

Rivers of France
Rivers of Mayenne
Rivers of Maine-et-Loire
Rivers of Pays de la Loire

External sources 
 River Mayenne (River Maine) and River Oudon, with maps and details of places, ports and moorings, by the author of Inland Waterways of France, Imray
 Navigation details for 80 French rivers and canals (French waterways website section)